Score: A Hockey Musical is a 2010 Canadian musical film written and directed by Michael McGowan starring Noah Reid, Allie MacDonald, Olivia Newton-John, Marc Jordan and Nelly Furtado.

Synopsis
Seventeen-year-old Farley Gordon has led a sheltered life, home-schooled and isolated by his parents. His closest friend is Eve, their next door neighbour. When his skill at hockey is realised, Farley is signed to a major hockey league and achieves instant fame and success. But pressure from his coach and teammates and a changing relationship with Eve begin to create intense strain in Farley's life.

Cast

Noah Reid as Farley Gordon
Allie MacDonald as Eve
Olivia Newton-John as Hope Gordon
Marc Jordan as Edgar Gordon
Nelly Furtado as an ardent hockey fan
Stephen McHattie as Walt Acorn
K. Trevor Wilson as shirtless fan
John Pyper-Ferguson as Coach Donker
John Robinson as Ace
Dru Viergever as Moose
Chris Ratz as Maurice
George Stroumboulopoulos as an arena announcer
Evan Solomon as himself
Brandon Firla as Don Mohan
Gianpaolo Venuta as Marco
Steve Kouleas as himself
Wesley Morgan as a sensitive player
Marc Trottier as Jean Luc, the Braces goalie
Paul O'Sullivan as a doctor
Walter Gretzky as himself
Theo Fleury as himself
John McDermott as himself
Hawksley Workman as Gump
Thomas Mitchell as Darryl

Songs
The soundtrack to Score: A Hockey Musical contains 21 songs:
"O Hockey Canada (O Canada)" by John McDermott and Canadian Children's Opera Company 
"Darryl vs. The Kid" 
"Best Friends" 
"Frozen Toe" 
"Hugs" by Olivia Newton-John 
"Give it a Shot" 
"Buck 55" 
"Kraft Dinner" 
"Baboons" 
"Donker's Dilemma" 
"Boyfriends" 
"Pacifism Defence" 
"Ordinary Boy" 
"Boy in the Bubble" 
"Dead and Done" 
"Toe to Toe" 
"Legends" 
"Eve's a Goddess" 
"Hockey, The Greatest Game in the Land (Movie Version)" 
"Time Stand Still" by Nelly Furtado 
"Hockey, The Greatest Game in the Land (Radio Edit)" by Hawksley Workman

Release
The film premiered at the Toronto International Film Festival on September 9, 2010 as part of its Opening Night Gala. It was released in theatres in Canada on October 22.

Home video
The DVD was released on January 18, 2011.

Reception
Peter Howell of the Toronto Star gave Score: A Hockey Musical two and-a-half stars out of four saying: "Score isn’t deep and there’s no danger of it becoming a global phenomenon. But it’s as true a crowd-pleaser, one that doesn't require season tickets to the Maple Leafs to appreciate." Stephen Cole of The Globe and Mail gave the film three stars out of four, praising McGowan's direction of its genre saying: "McGowan's (Saint Ralph) wondrous achievement here is making a discarded genre seem like ready-made fun. He does so by creating a playful satire of musicals, while somehow - this is the hard part - capturing the charm that made song and dance movies so popular."
Other reviews were less positive. Greig Dymond of CBC said the film is "marred by weak lyrics, even weaker melodies and a number of actors who probably shouldn’t be singing in public."  Will Sloan of Exclaim! said the film "fails resoundingly on every level" and "that it was selected to open the Toronto International Film Festival is embarrassing."

References

External links
 
 
 

2010 films
English-language Canadian films
2010s musical comedy films
Canadian musical comedy films
Canadian ice hockey films
Canadian sports comedy films
Films directed by Michael McGowan
Films set in Toronto
Films shot in Toronto
2010s sports comedy films
2010 comedy films
2010s English-language films
2010s Canadian films